Irina Dmitrievna Khavronina (born 31 July 2004) is a Russian ice dancer. With her former skating partner, Dario Cirisano, she is the 2020 Winter Youth Olympic champion and the 2022 Russian junior champion.

Personal life 
Khavronina was born on 31 July 2004 in Moscow, Russia.

Career

Early years 
Khavronina began learning how to skate as a five-year-old in 2009. She began competing in ice dance during the 2012–13 season, skating in domestic Russian events with her first partner, Ivan Desyatov. The two skated together at the novice level for two seasons. In 2014, she teamed up with Nikita Tashirev. They competed together for four seasons and won three international medals in advanced novice events before parting ways.

In 2018, Khavronina teamed up with Dario Cirisano. The two finished 11th at the 2019 Russian Junior Figure Skating Championships.

2019–20 season: Junior international debut 
Khavronina/Cirisano made their international debut in January at the 2020 Winter Youth Olympics in Lausanne, Switzerland. They ranked first in both segments and outscored fellow Russians Sofya Tyutyunina / Alexander Shustitskiy by 5.48 points to take the gold medal.

2020–21 season 
Due to the COVID-19 pandemic, the international junior season was cancelled, and Khavronina/Cirisano competed exclusively domestically. They won the bronze medal at the 2021 Russian Junior Championships.

2021–22 season 
With the resumption of international junior competition, Khavronina/Cirisano received their first ISU Junior Grand Prix assignment to the 2021 JGP Russia in September. The team scored a new personal best to win the rhythm dance and ultimately took the gold medal overall, despite falling slightly behind compatriots Sofia Leonteva / Daniil Gorelkin in the free dance. 

At their next assignment, 2021 JGP Poland, Khavronina/Cirisano again upgraded their personal best in the rhythm dance, scoring 68.05 points to win the segment.

Programs

With Cirisano

Competitive highlights 
JGP: Junior Grand Prix

With Cirisano

With Tashirev

Detailed results

With Cirisano

Junior results

References

External links 

 

2004 births
Russian female ice dancers
Living people
Figure skaters from Moscow
Figure skaters at the 2020 Winter Youth Olympics
Youth Olympic gold medalists for Russia